Andrallus is a genus of predatory stink bugs in the family Pentatomidae. There is at least one described species in Andrallus, A. spinidens.

References

Further reading

External links

 

Asopinae
Pentatomidae genera
Articles created by Qbugbot